Hellinsia improbus is a moth of the family Pterophoridae. It is found in  China (Guangdong).

References

Moths described in 1934
improbus
Moths of Asia